Zhaoxian or Zhao Xian may refer to:
Zhao County, Hebei, China
Zhaoxian (Taoism), "illuminated immortals", who achieve transcendence through constant periods of thought and recollection

People with the name Zhaoxian or Zhao Xian include:
 Bi Gui (died 249), courtesy name Zhaoxian, official of the state of Cao Wei
 Emperor Wenzong of Tang (809–840), posthumous name Emperor Zhaoxian
 Empress Dowager Du (–961), posthumous name Empress Dowager Zhaoxian, mother of Emperor Taizu of Song
 Emperor Gong of Song (1271–1323), personal name Zhao Xian

See also
King Zhaoxiang of Qin (325–251 BC)